Love Lessons may refer to:
 Love Lessons (album), a 1995 album by Tracy Byrd
 "Love Lessons" (song), its title track
 Love Lessons (novel), a 2005 British children's novel by Jaqueline Wilson

See also
A Lesson in Love, a 1954 Swedish comedy film directed by Ingmar Bergman
A Lesson in Love (1931 film), an American comedy starring Helen Kane

fr:Un coeur brisé